Dolabellopsocidae is an insect family of Psocodea (formerly Psocoptera) belonging to the suborder Psocomorpha, that includes the genera Isthmopsocus, Dolabellopsocus, and Auroropsocus. Like the other members of the infraorder Epipsocetae, they have a labrum with two sclerotized ridges.  The family, which contains more than 40 known species, was first identified by Eertmoed in 1973.

Sources 

 Lienhard, C. & Smithers, C. N. 2002. Psocoptera (Insecta): World Catalogue and Bibliography. Instrumenta Biodiversitatis, vol. 5. Muséum d'histoire naturelle, Genève.

Psocoptera families
Psocomorpha